Fangliao Township is a rural township in Pingtung County, Taiwan.

History
In 1867, the village of Pangliau was located at the shore of a bay. American consul Charles Le Gendre, reporting on his 1867 visit to southern Formosa (see Formosa Expedition), wrote: "The products are rice and peanuts. Women pound the rice and till the fields, while the men are entirely taken up with fishing." The high mountains to the east were the "exclusive domain of the savage aborigines, who receive from the Chinese (or half-caste) population a certain share of their crops".

In 1875, Imperial commissioner Shen Baozhen, who had been charged with making arrangements to prevent the Japanese from occupying Chinese districts, began introducing reforms in government. Pangliau was incorporated into Hengchun District, which was created from the portion of Fongshan District south of a river slightly north of Pangliau.

Geography
 Area: 
 Population: 22,911 (February 2023)

Climate
Fangliao has a tropical savanna climate, with warm to hot weather year-round, precipitation mainly occur during the wet season from May to September, typical of the rest of the Pingtung Plain.

Administrative divisions
The township comprises 15 villages: Anle, Baosheng, Dazhuang, Deli, Fangliao, Longshan, Neiliao, Renhe, Taiyuan, Tianshi, Tunghai, Xinkai, Xinlong, Yuquan and Zhongliao.

Transportation

The township is served by Fangliao Station and Donghai Station of the Taiwan Railways.

Popular culture
It was also the location for the filming of the second season of the American show Wipeout.

References

Bibliography

External links

 Fangliau Township Office  

Townships in Pingtung County